The Brazil national futsal team represents Brazil during international futsal competitions. It is under the direction of the Brazilian Football Confederation (CBF). The team is considered to be the strongest in the world earning a record three straight championships in the FIFA Futsal World Cup. Brazil also holds a record twelve championship wins in the South American Futsal Championship also known as the Copa América de Futsal and five wins in the Taça América de Futsal. As of November 2016, Brazil is ranked first in the Futsal World Rankings. Brazil has played in all FIFA Futsal World Cups and has finished in the top three places eight times, which includes the recent Futsal World Cup in 2021.

History

FIFA Era
Ever since the early days of the FIFA Futsal World Cup, Brazil have been a force to be reckoned with on the international scene. The Auriverde claimed the trophy at the first three editions of the showpiece event, at Netherlands 1989, Hong Kong 1992 and Spain 1996, but were outstripped by their futsal bête noire, Spain. La Furia Roja proved to be too strong for Brazil in the Final of Guatemala 2000 and at the semi-final stage of Chinese Taipei 2004, where they went on to take the title once more. Brazil won their 4th and 5th titles in Brazil 2008 and Thailand 2012, beating Spain in the finals of these two editions respectively. They are known for defeating East Timor 76–0 in the 2006 Lusophony Games in Macau.

Results and fixtures

The following is a list of match results in the last 12 months, as well as any future matches that have been scheduled.
Legend

2021

Team

Current squad
The following players were called up to the Brazil squad for a tournament in France played from 5 April to 10 April 2022.

Head coach: Marquinhos Xavier

Recent call-ups
The following players have also been called up to the Brazil squad within the last 5 years.

INJ Player withdrew from the squad due to an injury.
COV Player withdrew from the squad due to contracting COVID-19.
PRE Preliminary squad.
RET Retired from international football.

Notable players
Jackson João Bosco Moreira dos Santos (1979–1988)
Douglas Pierotti (1980–1989)
Eduardo Valdez Basso (1983–1991)
Raul Cerqueira de Rezende (1985–1990)
Paulo Sérgio Lira Goés (1992–2004)
Jorge Luis da Costa Pimentel (1992)
Manoel Tobias (1992–2004)
Vander (1988–1997)
Carlos Roberto Castro Silva (1993–1999)
Lenísio (1999–2012)
Falcão (1998–2018)

Competitive record

FIFA Futsal World Cup

FIFUSA/AMF Futsal World Cup

Copa América de Futsal

South American Futsal Championship (Unofficial)
1965 –  2nd place
1969 –  Champions
1971 –  Champions (host)
1973 –  Champions
1975 –  Champions
1976 –  Champions
1977 –  Champions (host)
1979 –  Champions
1983 –  Champions
1986 –  Champions
1989 –  Champions (host)

Copa América de Futsal

1992 –  Champions (host)
1995 –  Champions (host)
1996 –  Champions (host)
1997 –  Champions (host)
1998 –  Champions (host)
1999 –  Champions (host)
2000 –  Champions (host)
2003 –  2nd place
2008 –  Champions
2011 –  Champions
2015 –  3rd place
2017 –  Champions

FIFA Futsal World Cup qualification (CONMEBOL)
2012 –  3rd place (host)
2016 –  Champions
2020 –  2rd place

Futsal Confederations Cup
2009 – Did not enter
2013 –  Champions (host)
2014 –  3rd place

Pan American Games
2007 –  Champions (host)

Panamerican FIFUSA Championship
1980 –  Champions
1984 –  Champions (host)
1990 – Did not enter
1993 – Semifinals
1996 – 4th place
1999 – Did not enter

South American Games
2002 –  Champions (host)
2006 –  Champions
2010 –  Champions
2014 –  Champions

Grand Prix de Futsal
2005 –  Champions (host)
2006 –  Champions (host)
2007 –  Champions (host)
2008 –  Champions (host)
2009 –  Champions (host)
2010 –  2nd place (host)
2011 –  Champions (host)
2013 –  Champions (host)
2014 –  Champions (host)
2015 –  Champions (host)
2018 –  Champions (host)

Futsal Mundialito
1995 –  Champions
1996 –  Champions
1998 –  Champions
2007 –  Champions
2008 –  Champions

Other tournaments
Futsal Pyramids Cup
2002 –  Champions
2003 –  3rd place
Futsal World Tournament
1986 – 8th place
1987 –  3rd place
1987 –  2nd place

Lusophony Games
2006 –  Champions
2009 –  Champions

Futsal Tiger's Cup
1997 –  2nd place
1999 –  Champions
2001 –  2nd place

KL World 5's (Futsal, Kuala Lumpur)
2003 –  2nd place
2008 –  Champions

IBSA Blind Futsal World Championship
1998 –  Champions
2000 –  Champions
2002 –  3rd place
2006 –  2nd place
2010 –  Champions

Ho Chi Minh City International Futsal Tournament
2013 –  Champions

Head-to-head record

See also
Sport in Brazil
Futsal in Brazil
Football in Brazil
Beach soccer in Brazil
Brazil women's national futsal team
Brazil national football team
Brazil women's national football team

Notes

References

 
South American national futsal teams
Futsal
Futsal
National